Thomas Joseph Doyle (born 30 June 1992) is a New Zealand international footballer who currently plays as a left back for Bay Olympic in the Northern League.

Doyle made his senior professional debut for Wellington Phoenix FC in the 2014 FFA Cup against Adelaide United at the Marden Sports Complex on 5 August 2014. Adelaide won the match 1–0 in regulation time. During his time  with Wellington, he also operated as centre back.

Following a short stint at German club Chemnitzer FC, where he made six appearances in four months, Auckland City confirmed that Doyle had returned to the club alongside club legend Emiliano Tade on 13 January 2020.

Doyle played for New Zealand at the 2017 Confederations Cup.

Honours
New Zealand: OFC Nations Cup: 2016

See also 
 List of Wellington Phoenix FC players

References

External links 

 

1992 births
Living people
Association football defenders
New Zealand association footballers
New Zealand international footballers
Auckland City FC players
Miramar Rangers AFC players
Team Wellington players
Wellington Phoenix FC players
Chemnitzer FC players
A-League Men players
3. Liga players
New Zealand Football Championship players
New Zealand people of Irish descent
2016 OFC Nations Cup players
2017 FIFA Confederations Cup players
New Zealand expatriate association footballers
Expatriate footballers in Germany
New Zealand expatriate sportspeople in Germany